Marvin Ammori is a lawyer, civil liberties advocate, and scholar best known for his work on network neutrality and Internet freedom issues. He currently serves as Chief Legal Officer of Uniswap.

Education and career 
Ammori attended Brother Rice High School and went on to study literature at the University of Michigan. He earned his Juris Doctor from Harvard Law School., where he studied under communications scholar Yochai Benkler.

In 2007, while serving as the general counsel for nonprofit advocacy group Free Press, Ammori wrote the original Comcast complaint to the FCC in the Comcast-BitTorrent case, the first network neutrality enforcement action in the United States. He was active in the debate over the controversial copyright bills SOPA and the PROTECT IP Act, arguing that the bills would violate the First Amendment.

From 2008 to 2011, Ammori taught law at the University of Nebraska-Lincoln-College of Law, where he helped launch the law school's program in space and telecommunications law.

In 2014 and 2015, he led the effort to get the Federal Communications Commission to adopt strong network neutrality rules on the basis of its Title II authority. Tim Wu, who coined the phrase network neutrality, said Ammori "deserved enormous credit for leading the march to Title II." Ammori collaborated with the John Oliver show Last Week Tonight for its network neutrality segment and worked with White House staff leading to President Obama's network neutrality plan. For this work, he was named to the Politico 50 and a Washington Tech Titan in 2015.

On June 14, 2016, the D.C. Circuit Court, which had in 2014 rejected the FCC's attempts to impose network neutrality rules under its 706 authority, upheld the Title II network neutrality rules, writing in the majority opinion that the FCC had overcome the problems of the previous rules "by reclassifying broadband service—and the interconnection arrangements necessary to provide it—as a telecommunications service" under Title II, thereby vindicating Ammori's legal approach.

From 2016 to 2018, Ammori served as general counsel of Virgin Hyperloop One, where he helped the company raise over $200 million.

In 2018, Ammori joined Protocol Labs.

Ammori was an advisor on season six for HBO’s Emmy award-winning show Silicon Valley. He is the author "On Internet Freedom."

Influence 
In 2013, Ammori was named a Bernard L. Schwartz Fellow at the New America Foundation. In 2015, he was named a Senior Fellow to the Democracy Fund.

He serves on the boards of public interest advocacy groups Demand Progress, Fight for the Future, and Engine, and is an affiliate scholar with Stanford Law School's Center for Internet and Society.

References

American lawyers
University of Nebraska–Lincoln faculty
University of Michigan alumni
Harvard Law School alumni
Living people
First Amendment scholars
Year of birth missing (living people)